Beacon is an art installation with twin cast-bronze sculptures by Lisa Scheer, installed outside Brooklyn's Theodore Roosevelt United States Courthouse, in the U.S. state of New York.

References

Bronze sculptures in Brooklyn
Outdoor sculptures in Brooklyn
Downtown Brooklyn